Michael Turian is a successful professional player of Magic: The Gathering. He won Pro Tour New York with Team Potato Nation. Turian also won two Grand Prixs. In 2008 Mike Turian was voted in the Hall of Fame. He was inducted during the World championship in Memphis.

Career 
Mike Turian qualified for Pro Tour (PT) Chicago 1997 at a PTQ in Akron, Ohio. He finished 27th at PT Chicago, winning money and automatically qualifying for the next PT in Mainz. An 11th place at Mainz was followed by several Pro Tour money finishes (Top 64 at the time). Eventually he won Pro Tour New York 2000 with teammates Gary Wise and Scott Johns. A 5th place at the World championship in Toronto in the season followed.

The next season started off well with a win Grand Prix Montreal 2001, but other than that some less successful seasons followed for Turian. Eventually the 2003–04 season became his most successful with final day appearance at PT Boston, Amsterdam, and San Diego. He also won another Grand Prix at Columbus.

He left the Pro Tour in 2004, to take a job as developer at Wizards of the Coast.

Accomplishments

Other accomplishments:
 Member of the 2008 Hall of Fame

References

Living people
American people of Armenian descent
American Magic: The Gathering players
People from Seattle
Year of birth missing (living people)